

Panama
 Julio Dely Valdés – Paris SG – 1995–97

Paraguay
 Antonio Acosta – Metz – 1953–58
Júnior Alonso – Lille – 2016–18
 Manuel Andrada – Nîmes Olympique – 1952–57
 Milner Ayala – Strasbourg – 1953–55
 Lucas Barrios – Montepellier – 2014–15
 Eugenio Jesus Berni Gomez – CO Roubaix-Tourcoing – 1954–56
 Roberto Cabañas – Brest, Lyon – 1989–90, 1990–92
 Julio César Cáceres – Nantes – 2004–05
 José Luis Chilavert – Strasbourg – 2000–01
 Heriberto Correa – Monaco – 1977–78
 Andrés Cubas – Nîmes – 2020–21
 Carlos Diarte – Saint-Étienne – 1983–84
 Marcelo Estigarribia – Le Mans – 2008–10
 Sebastián Fleitas – Nîmes Olympique – 1972–73
 Adolfo Godoy – Rouen – 1967–68
 Hugo González – Red Star – 1971–73, 1974–75
 Ángel Jara – Toulouse FC (1937), Red Star – 1962–66
 Alfredo Mendoza – Brest – 1989–91
 Carlos Monnin – Toulouse FC (1937), Red Star – 1964–73
 José Parodi – Nîmes Olympique – 1961–67
 Federico Santander – Toulouse FC – 2010–11
 Leongino Unzain – Béziers – 1957–58

Peru
 Wilmer Aguirre – Metz – 2007–08
Cristian Benavente – Nantes – 2019–20
 Manuel Corrales – Metz – 2007–08
 Jean Deza – Montpellier – 2013–16
 Raúl Fernández – Nice – 2011–12
 Andrés Mendoza – Marseille – 2005–06
 Percy Prado – Nantes – 2019–20
 Miguel Trauco – Saint-Étienne – 2019–22

Poland
 Jacek Bąk – Lyon, Lens – 1995–2005
 Dariusz Bayer – Valenciennes – 1992–93
 Bernard Blaut – Metz – 1972–74
Adam Buksa – Lens – 2022–
 Bronisław Bula – Rouen – 1982–83
 Marcin Bułka – Paris SG, Nice – 2019–
 Ryszard Czerwiec – Guingamp – 1997–98
 Jan Domarski – Nîmes Olympique – 1976–78
 Dariusz Dudka – Auxerre – 2008–12
 Eugeniusz Faber – Lens – 1973–75
Karol Fila – Strasbourg – 2021–
 Krzysztof Frankowski – Nantes, Le Havre – 1983–88
Przemysław Frankowski – Lens – 2021–
 Tomasz Frankowski – Strasbourg – 1994–96
 Dominik Furman – Toulouse – 2014–16
 Robert Gadocha – Nantes – 1975–77
 Kamil Glik – Monaco – 2016–20
 Kamil Grosicki – Rennes – 2014–17
 Ryszard Grzegorczyk – Lens – 1973–75
 Paweł Janas – Auxerre – 1982–86
 Andrzej Jarosik – Strasbourg – 1974–76
 Ireneusz Jeleń – Auxerre, Lille – 2006–12
 Marek Jóźwiak – Guingamp – 1996–98, 2000–01
 Zbigniew Kaczmarek – Auxerre – 1990–92
 Henryk Kasperczak – Metz – 1978–80
 Tomasz Kłos – Auxerre – 1998–2000
 Józef Klose – Auxerre – 1980–81
 Roman Kosecki – Nantes, Montpellier – 1995–97
 Grzegorz Krychowiak – Bordeaux, Reims, Paris SG – 2011–14, 2016-17
 Andrzej Kubica – Nice – 1996–97
 Janusz Kupcewicz – Saint-Étienne – 1983–84
Rafał Kurzawa – Amiens – 2018–19
 Marcin Kuźba – Auxerre – 1998–99
 Grzegorz Lewandowski – Caen – 1996–97
 Igor Lewczuk – Bordeaux – 2016–19
Mateusz Lis – Troyes – 2022–
 Henryk Maculewicz – Lens – 1979–81
 Radosław Majecki – Monaco – 2020–
 Joachim Marx – Lens – 1975–78
 Krzysztof Marx – Bordeaux – 1990–91
 Zygmunt Maszczyk – Valenciennes – 1976–79
 Waldemar Matysik – Auxerre – 1987–90
 Włodzimierz Mazur – Rennes – 1983–84
Arkadiusz Milik – Marseille – 2020–
 Henryk Miłoszewicz – Le Havre – 1985–86
 Józef Młynarczyk – Bastia – 1984–86
 Eugeniusz Nagiel – Valenciennes – 1981–82
 Ludovic Obraniak – Metz, Lille, Bordeaux – 2003–14
 Roman Ogaza – Lens – 1982–84
 Paweł Orzechowski – Lens – 1973–74
 Maryan Paszko – Saint-Étienne – 1957–58, 1961–62
 Damien Perquis – Saint Etienne, Sochaux – 2006–12
 Mariusz Piekarski – Bastia – 1998–99
 Jan Pietras – FC Nancy – 1947–48
 Łukasz Poręba – Lens – 2022–
 Maciej Rybus – Lyon – 2016–17
 Marek Saganowski – Troyes – 2006–07
 Zbigniew Seweryn – Tours – 1980–81
 Mariusz Stępiński – Nantes – 2016–17
 Krzysztof Surlit – Nîmes Olympique – 1983–84
 Piotr Świerczewski – Saint-Étienne, Bastia, Marseille – 1993–2002
 Andrzej Szarmach – Auxerre – 1980–85
 Józef Szczyrba – Rouen – 1969–70
 Marian Szeja – Metz – 1973–74
 Roman Szewczyk – Sochaux – 1993–95
 Jan Szymczak – Montpellier – 1947–49
 Ryszard Tarasiewicz – AS Nancy, Lens – 1990–94
 Mirosław Tłokiński – Lens – 1983–85
 Cezary Tobollik – Lens – 1986–89
 Wojciech Tyc – Valenciennes – 1981–82
 Henryk Wieczorek – Auxerre – 1980–82
 Eugeniusz Wieńcierz – Angers – 1980–81
 Tomasz Wieszczycki – Le Havre – 1996–97
Mateusz Wieteska – Clermont – 2022–
 Erwin Wilczek – Valenciennes – 1972–73
 Jerzy Wilim – Rennes – 1976–77
 Walter Winkler – Lens – 1974–76
 Piotr Włodarczyk – Auxerre – 2002
 Aleksander Wolniak – Valenciennes – 1967–71
 Jan Wraży – Valenciennes – 1975–80
 Marcin Żewłakow – Metz – 2005–06
 Andrzej Zgutczyński – Auxerre – 1986–88
 Jacek Ziober – Montpellier – 1990–93

Portugal
 Manuel Abreu – Paris SG, AS Nancy – 1983–86
 Agostinho – Paris SG – 2001–02
 João Alves – Paris SG – 1979–80
 Paulo Alves – Bastia – 1998–99
 Alexis Araujo – Lorient – 2015–16
 Hélder Baptista – Paris SG – 1998–99
 Rui Barros – Monaco, Marseille – 1990–94
 Bruno Basto – Bordeaux, Saint-Étienne – 2000–04, 2005–06
 Beto – Bordeaux – 2005–06
 Pedro Brazão – Nice – 2018–19
 Cafú – Lorient, Metz – 2016–18
 Marco Caneira – Bordeaux – 2002–04
 Ricardo Carvalho – Monaco – 2013–16
 Ivan Cavaleiro – Monaco – 2015–16
 Fernando Chalana – Bordeaux – 1984–87
 Humberto Coelho – Paris SG – 1975–77
 Fábio Coentrão – Monaco – 2015–16
 Mário Coluna – Lyon – 1970–71
 Abdu Conté – Troyes – 2021–
 David Costa – Lens – 2020–
 Ricardo Costa – Lille OSC – 2009–10
 Costinha – AS Monaco – 1997–2001
 Victor Da Silva – AS Monaco, Lille OSC – 1983–84, 1988–92
 Pedro De Figuereido – Lille OSC – 1986–88
 Delfim – Marseille – 2001–06
 Gil Dias – Monaco – 2017–18, 2019–20
 Dimas – Marseille – 2001–02
 Tiago Djaló – Lille – 2019–
 Eder – Lille – 2016–17
 Hélder Esteves – Auxerre – 2001–02
 Walter Ferreira – Red Star – 1970–72
Afonso Figueiredo – Rennes – 2017–18
José Fonte – Lille – 2018–
 Rui Fonte – Lille – 2018–19
 Paulo Futre – Marseille – 1993–94
 José Gaspar – Ajaccio – 2004–05
 André Gomes – Lille – 2022–
 Claude Gonçalves – AC Ajaccio – 2013–14 
 Antonio Gouveia – Montpellier – 1999–00
 Gonçalo Guedes – Paris SG – 2016–17 
 Raphaël Guerreiro – Lorient – 2013–16 
 Hélder – Paris SG – 2004–05
 Tiago Ilori – Bordeaux – 2014–15
 João Paulo – Le Mans – 2009–10
 Daniel Kenedy – Paris SG – 1996–97
 Hugo Leal – Paris SG – 2001–04
 Rafael Leão – Lille – 2018–19
 Paolo Lebas – Ajaccio – 2022–
 Anthony Lopes – Lyon – 2012–
 Miguel Lopes – Lyon – 2013–14
Rony Lopes – Lille, Monaco, Nice, Troyes – 2014–21, 2022–
 Paulo Machado – Saint-Étienne, Toulouse FC – 2008–12
 Ariza Makukula – Nantes – 2002–03
 Ricardo Mangas – Bordeaux – 2021–22
 Afonso Martins – Nancy – 1991–92
 Gelson Martins – Monaco – 2018–
 Nuno Mendes (1978) – Strasbourg – 2000–01
 Nuno Mendes (2002) – Paris SG – 2021–
 Pedro Mendes – Rennes, Montpellier – 2015–
 Eliseo Manuel Mendonca – Rennes – 1966–67
João Moutinho – Monaco – 2013–18
 Oceano – Toulouse FC – 1998–99
 Nélson Oliveira – Rennes – 2013–14
 Sérgio Oliveira – Nantes – 2016–17
 Rui Pataca – Montpellier – 1999–2000, 2001–04
 Pauleta – Bordeaux, Paris SG – 2000–08
 Paulo Sérgio (Paulo Sérgio da Costa) – Bordeaux – 2003–04
 Paulo Sérgio (Paulo Sérgio Rodrigues de Almeida) – Montpellier – 2001–03
 Danilo Pereira – Paris SG – 2020–
 Ricardo Pereira – Nice – 2015–17
 Mathias Pereira Lage – Angers, Brest – 2019–
 Jorge Plácido – RC Paris – 1988–90
 Hélder Postiga – Saint-Étienne – 2005–06
 Pedro Rebocho – Guingamp – 2017–19
 Tiago Ribeiro – Monaco – 2021–
 Rolando – Marseille – 2015–19
 Renato Sanches – Lille, Paris SG – 2019–
 Adrien Silva – Monaco – 2019–20
 Bernardo Silva – Monaco – 2014–17
 Mario Silva – Nantes – 2000–01
 Luís Sobrinho – RC Paris – 1989–90
 Heriberto Tavares – Brest – 2020–21
Nuno Tavares – Marseille – 2022–
 Filipe Teixeira – Paris SG – 2002–03, 2004–05
 Tiago – Lyon – 2005–07
 Vitinha (Vítor Ferreira) – Paris SG – 2022–
 Vitinha (Vítor Oliveira) – Marseille – 2022–
 Xeka – Lille, Dijon, Rennes – 2016–

References and notes

Books

Club pages
AJ Auxerre former players
AJ Auxerre former players
Girondins de Bordeaux former players
Girondins de Bordeaux former players
Les ex-Tangos (joueurs), Stade Lavallois former players
Olympique Lyonnais former players
Olympique de Marseille former players
FC Metz former players
AS Monaco FC former players
Ils ont porté les couleurs de la Paillade... Montpellier HSC Former players
AS Nancy former players
FC Nantes former players
Paris SG former players
Red Star Former players
Red Star former players
Stade de Reims former players
Stade Rennais former players
CO Roubaix-Tourcoing former players
AS Saint-Étienne former players
Sporting Toulon Var former players

Others

stat2foot
footballenfrance
French Clubs' Players in European Cups 1955–1995, RSSSF
Finnish players abroad, RSSSF
Italian players abroad, RSSSF
Romanians who played in foreign championships
Swiss players in France, RSSSF
EURO 2008 CONNECTIONS: FRANCE, Stephen Byrne Bristol Rovers official site

Notes

France
 
Association football player non-biographical articles